Julius Graf von Mirbach (27 June 1839, Sorquitten – 26 June 1921) was a German politician, born in Sorquitten, East Prussia.

He studied law at University of Königsberg, Bonn, and Berlin and served as an officer in the Prussian Army, resigning in 1865. 

In 1874 he entered the Prussian House of Lords and in 1878-81 and 1886-98 was a member of the Reichstag and a prominent figure in the German Conservative Party, taking a foremost part in economic and agrarian reforms, acting as leader of the Steuer-und Wirtschaftsreformer (1879 et seq.). He was created Count in 1888.

References

1839 births
1921 deaths
People from Mrągowo County
People from the Province of Prussia
Counts of Germany
German Protestants
German Conservative Party politicians
Members of the 4th Reichstag of the German Empire
Members of the 7th Reichstag of the German Empire
Members of the 8th Reichstag of the German Empire
Members of the 9th Reichstag of the German Empire
Members of the Prussian House of Lords
Humboldt University of Berlin alumni
University of Bonn alumni
University of Königsberg alumni
Prussian Army personnel